Paul Franklin (born 5 October 1963) is an English football coach and former professional player.

Career

Playing career
Franklin, who played as a central defender, began his career at Watford, making 32 appearances in the Football League between his debut in May 1983 and 1987. While at Watford, Franklin spent loan spells at Shrewsbury Town and Swindon Town. Franklin later signed for Reading, making 20 League appearances over the next two seasons, before dropping into non-League football with Wycombe Wanderers.

Coaching career
After retiring as a player, Franklin worked as a coach at Wycombe Wanderers, Norwich City (also being caretaker manager for one game in 1995) and Leicester City, before later managing non-League sides Norwich United and Diss Town.

References

1963 births
Association football central defenders
Living people
English footballers
English football managers
Watford F.C. players
Shrewsbury Town F.C. players
Swindon Town F.C. players
Reading F.C. players
Wycombe Wanderers F.C. players
English Football League players
Norwich City F.C. managers
Diss Town F.C. managers
Wycombe Wanderers F.C. non-playing staff
Norwich City F.C. non-playing staff
Leicester City F.C. non-playing staff